Biddeford is a city in York County, Maine, United States. It is the principal commercial center of York County. Its population was 22,552 at the 2020 census. The twin cities of Saco and Biddeford include the resort communities of Biddeford Pool and Fortunes Rocks. The town is the site of the University of New England and the annual La Kermesse Franco-Americaine Festival. First visited by Europeans in 1616, it is the site of one of the earliest European settlements in the United States. It is home to Saint Joseph's Church, the tallest building in Maine.

Biddeford is a principal population center of the Portland-South Portland-Biddeford metropolitan statistical area.

History

The first European to settle at Biddeford was physician Richard Vines in the winter of 1616–1617 at Winter Harbor, as he called Biddeford Pool. This 1616 landing by a European antedates the Mayflower landing in Plymouth, Massachusetts, (located 100 miles to the south) by about four years, a fact  overlooked in much of New England lore. In 1630, the Plymouth Company granted the land south of the River Swanckadocke to Dr. Vines and John Oldham. In 1653, the town included both sides of the river, and was incorporated by the Massachusetts General Court as Saco.

Biddeford was first incorporated as the Town of Saco in 1653. Roger Spencer was granted the right in 1653 to build the first sawmill. Lumber and fish became the community's chief exports. In 1659, Major William Phillips of Boston became a proprietor, and constructed a garrison and mill at the falls. During King Philip's War in 1675, the town was attacked by Indians. Settlers withdrew to Winter Harbor for safety, and their homes and mills upriver at the falls were burned. In 1693, a stone fort was built a short distance below the falls, but it was captured by the Indians in 1703, when 11 colonists were killed and 24 taken captive to Canada. In 1688, Fort Mary was built near the entrance to Biddeford Pool. The town was reorganized in 1718 as Biddeford, after Bideford, a town in Devon, England, from which some settlers had emigrated. After the Fall of Quebec in 1759, hostilities with the natives ceased.

In 1762, the land northeast of the river was set off as Pepperellborough, which in 1805 was renamed Saco. The first bridge to Saco was built in 1767. The river divides into two falls that drop , providing water power for mills. Factories were established to make boots and shoes. The developing mill town also had granite quarries and brickyards, in addition to lumber and grain mills. Major textile manufacturing facilities were constructed along the riverbanks, including the Laconia Company in 1845, and the Pepperell Company in 1850. Biddeford was incorporated as a city in 1855.

The mills attracted waves of immigrants, including the Irish, Albanians, and French-Canadians from  Quebec. At one time, the textile mills employed as many as 12,000 people, but as happened elsewhere, the industry entered a long period of decline. As of 2009, the last remaining textile company in the city, WestPoint Home, closed. The property occupying the mill has been sold and is being redeveloped into housing and new businesses. The last log drive down the Saco River was in 1943, with the last log sawed in 1948. Biddeford's name is engraved near the top level of The Pilgrim Monument, in Provincetown, Massachusetts, along with the names of some of the oldest cities and towns in New England.

During World War II, the Biddeford Pool Military Reservation was established from 1942 to 1945, on what is now the Abenakee Golf Club. It had four circular concrete platforms called "Panama mounts" for 155-mm guns, three of which remain today.

Geography

Situated beside Saco Bay on the Gulf of Maine, Biddeford is drained by the Little River and the Saco River. The city proper has very diverse geography, from inland rolling hillside, to urban settlement, to coastal sprawl.

The city is crossed by Interstate 95, U. S. Route 1, and state routes 5, 9, 111, and 208. It is bordered by the city of Saco to the north, the Atlantic Ocean to the east, the towns of Dayton and Lyman to the west, and the towns of Kennebunkport and Arundel to the south. The Little River forms a portion of the border between Biddeford and the Goose Rocks neighborhood of Kennebunkport, in Biddeford's most southerly region (Granite Point). East Point, located on the peninsula of Biddeford Pool, is the easternmost point in York County.

Timber Island, the most southerly point in the City of Biddeford, lies in Goosefare Bay at the mouth of the Little River, and is accessible at low tide from Goose Rocks Beach in Kennebunkport. The island and most of adjacent Timber Point became part of the Rachel Carson National Wildlife Refuge in December 2011.

The city has almost  of frontage along the Saco River, and an Atlantic coastline on which the seaside neighborhoods of Hills Beach, Biddeford Pool, Fortunes Rocks and Granite Point are located. Biddeford includes Wood Island Light, a lighthouse located about a mile offshore from Biddeford Pool.

Climate
This climatic region is typified by large seasonal temperature differences, with warm to hot (and often humid) summers and cold (sometimes severely cold) winters. According to the Köppen climate classification, Biddeford has a humid continental climate, Dfb on climate maps.

Demographics

2010 census
At the 2010 census, there were 21,277 people, 8,598 households and 4,972 families residing in the city. The racial makeup of the city was 94.8% White, 1.0% African American, 0.5% Native American, 1.7% Asian, 0.4% from other races, and 1.6% from two or more races. Hispanic or Latino of any race were 1.7% of the population.

There were 8,598 households, of which 27.3% had children under the age of 18 living with them, 40.4% were married couples living together, 12.3% had a female householder with no husband present, 5.1% had a male householder with no wife present, and 42.2% were non-families. 30.0% of all households were made up of individuals, and 11.1% had someone living alone who was 65 years of age or older. The average household size was 2.30 and the average family size was 2.84.

The median age in the city was 38.3 years. 18.7% of residents were under the age of 18; 15.4% were between the ages of 18 and 24; 24.3% were from 25 to 44; 26.1% were from 45 to 64; and 15.3% were 65 years of age or older. The gender makeup of the city was 47.5% male and 52.5% female.

2000 census
At the 2000 census, there were 20,942 people, 8,636 households and 5,259 families residing in the city. The racial makeup of the city was 96.65 percent White, 0.64 percent African American, 0.40 percent Native American, 0.99 percent Asian, 0.03 percent Pacific Islander, 0.18 percent from other races, and 1.12 percent from two or more races. Hispanic or Latino of any race were 0.65 percent of the population.

There were 7,636 households, of which 28.4 percent had children under the age of 18 living with them, 44.4 percent were married couples living together, 12.2 percent had a female householder with no husband present, and 39.1 percent were non-families. 29.7 percent of all households were made up of individuals, and 11.1 percent had someone living alone who was 65 years of age or older. The average household size was 2.32 and the average family size was 2.88.

22.1 percent of the population were under the age of 18, 11.1 percent from 18 to 24, 29.5 percent from 25 to 44, 21.8 percent from 45 to 64, and 15.5 percent who were 65 years of age or older. The median age was 36 years. For every 100 females, there were 88.2 males. For every 100 females age 18 and over, there were 84.4 males.

The median household income was $37,164 and the median family income was $44,109. Males had a median income of $32,008 versus $24,715 for females. The per capita income for the city was $18,214. About 8.6 percent of families and 13.8 percent of the population were below the poverty line, including 19.8 percent of those under age 18 and 10.3 percent of those age 65 or over.

Economy
Biddeford is one of Maine's fastest-growing commercial centers, due to its close proximity to the Seacoast Region of New Hampshire and to northern Massachusetts. In recent years, strip malls have developed along the State Route 111 corridor. In late 2006, a  shopping center known as The Shops at Biddeford Crossing opened, with 20 stores and five restaurants.

Recent interest in revitalizing the downtown area has brought new life to the old mills. The North Dam Mill is one example of this movement offering retail stores, art studios, cultural events, and upscale housing.

Biddeford is home to large institutions including Southern Maine Health Care and the University of New England, a fast-growing school located along the coast which includes Maine's only medical school, the University of New England College of Osteopathic Medicine. Telecommunications company GWI.net is headquartered in the city. The city also possesses a wide array of community facilities including public beaches, an ice arena, a full-service YMCA, and one school which has been recently recognized as a National School of Excellence.

Arts and culture

Tourism
Anchoring Biddeford's historic downtown are McArthur Public Library and Biddeford's City Theater. Biddeford has a number of properties and two Historic Districts entered into the National Register of Historic Places. The newest addition is the Main Street Historic District, entered into the National Register on December 24, 2009. Other downtown National Register properties include the Biddeford-Saco Mills Historic District, Biddeford City Hall, Dudley Block and the U.S. Post Office. National Register properties outside of downtown and in the Biddeford Pool area include the John Tarr House, First Parish Meetinghouse, Fletcher's Neck Lifesaving Station and the James Montgomery Flagg House.

Sites of interest
Biddeford Historical Society
McArthur Public Library
Franco-American Genealogical Society of York County
City Theater for the Performing Arts
Biddeford Cultural and Heritage Center
Biddeford History and Heritage Project//Maine Memory Network
Biddeford Mills Museum

Infrastructure

Transportation
Biddeford was the eastern terminus of the now-defunct New England Interstate Route 11, which ended in Manchester, Vermont. State Route 111, which travels through Biddeford's main commercial corridor, is now numbered in Old Route 11's place. Biddeford Municipal Airport is located two miles south of the central business district. The Saco Transportation Center Amtrak stop serves downtown Biddeford.

Local bus service in Biddeford is provided by Biddeford-Saco-Old Orchard Beach Transit, connecting the city to destinations in Saco and Portland.

Notable people 

Cajetan J. B. Baumann O.F.B., AIA, (1899–1969), first member of a religious order to be named to the American Institute of Architects earned an honorary degree from St. Francis College in Biddeford
 Robert Caret, current Chancellor Emeritus of The University System of Maryland and formerly President of the University of Massachusetts
 Ovid Demaris, author
 Susan Deschambault, State Senator
 Brian Dumoulin, NHL Hockey Player 
 Ryan Fecteau, State Representative, Speaker of the Maine House of Representatives
 R.A.P. Ferreira, American rapper and producer
John R. French, U.S. Congressman
 Cor van den Heuvel, poet and editor
 Mark Langdon Hill, U.S. Congressman
 Linda Kasabian, former Manson Family member involved in the Helter Skelter Murders
 Louis B. Lausier, mayor (1941–1955) and candidate for Governor (1948)
Moses Macdonald, U.S. Congressman
 Hilary F. Mahaney, football player
 Prentiss Mellen, U.S. Senator and jurist
 Thomas Bird Mosher, publisher
 Wallace H. Nutting, Four-star general and mayor of Biddeford
 Bernard Osher, businessman and philanthropist
 Freddy Parent, professional baseball player
 Henry B. Quinby, physician and 52nd Governor of New Hampshire
 Daniel E. Somes, U.S. Congressman and mayor
 Charles A. Shaw, mayor (1865–1866), inventor and entrepreneur
 Bettina Steinke, muralist, was born here in 1913
 James Sullivan, jurist and the seventh Governor of Massachusetts
 George Thatcher, judge and congressman
 Joanne Twomey, state representative (1998–2006) and mayor (2006–2011)
 Joan Wasser, singer and songwriter
 Amos Whitney, engineer and inventor

See also
Neal Manufacturing Company

References

Further reading
 Biddeford History & Heritage Project - A comprehensive history website and exhibit space created by Biddeford's cultural community and hosted by the Maine Memory Network / Maine Historical Society.
  History of Saco and Biddeford by George Folsom. Saco, [Me.] : Printed by A. C. Putnam, 1830. (Courtesy of Google Books)

External links

 
Populated places established in 1616
Portland metropolitan area, Maine
Cities in York County, Maine
1616 establishments in the Thirteen Colonies
Cities in Maine
Populated coastal places in Maine